Unus mundus (Latin for "One world") is an underlying concept of Western philosophy, theology, and alchemy, of a primordial unified reality from which everything derives. The term can be traced back to medieval Scholasticism though the notion itself dates back at least as far as Plato's allegory of the cave.

The idea was popularized in the 20th century by the Swiss psychoanalyst Carl Gustav Jung, though the term can be traced back to scholastics such as Duns Scotus and was taken up again in the 16th century by Gerhard Dorn, a student of the famous alchemist Paracelsus.

Jung and Pauli

Jung, in conjunction with the physicist Wolfgang Pauli, explored the possibility that his concepts of archetypes and synchronicity might be related to the unus mundus - the archetype being an expression of unus mundus; synchronicity, or "meaningful coincidence", being made possible by the fact that both the observer and connected phenomenon ultimately stem from the same source, the unus mundus.

Jung was careful, however, to stress the tentative and provisional nature of such explorations into a unitarian idea of reality.

See also 
Anima mundi
 Bernardus Silvestris
Double-aspect theory
 Eric Neumann
 Monopsychism
 Neutral monism
 Sufi metaphysics
 Unconscious spirit

References

Further reading
 Jung, C. G., (1934–1954). The Archetypes and The Collective Unconscious. (1981 2nd ed. Collected Works Vol.9 Part 1), Princeton, N.J.: Bollingen. .
Jung, C. G. (1955–56). From "The Conjunction", Mysterium Coniunctionis, Collected Works, XIV, New Jersey: Princeton University Press.

External links
 The Psychic Continuum 

Alchemical concepts
Analytical psychology
Western esotericism